The following is a list of 2016 box office number-one films in Japan. When the number-one film in gross is not the same as the number-one film in admissions, both are listed.

References

See also
List of Japanese films of 2016

2016
2016 in Japanese cinema
Japan